Eron Falbo is a Brazilian singer-songwriter and musician who has traveled and played internationally. He lived part of his childhood in the United States and also spent time studying in Switzerland before living in Paris, Buenos Aires, London, and most recently Budapest. He began his career in music as a DJ and also played guitar and sang in a cover band, performing shows on cruises.

Falbo traveled to the United States in 2009 and later contacted Bob Johnston to produce an album for him. Johnston agreed and produced Falbo's 2013 album 73. The first batch of songs on the album were recorded in Nashville with a band assembled by Johnston including drummer Paul Leim, bassist David Hungate, guitarist Kerry Marx and pianist Shane Keister. Falbo then traveled to London where he recorded the remainder of the album at Konk Studios. When asked about producing the album for Falbo, Johnston stated, "The people I choose are destined for greatness and Eron Falbo is unique in our generation."

Discography

Singles
 2012, The Night 
 2011, Beat The Drums

Albums
 2013, 73

References

External links
 Eron Falbo Official Website

Living people
Brazilian guitarists
Brazilian male guitarists
Brazilian harmonica players
Year of birth missing (living people)